Aldrich Killian is a supervillain appearing in American comic books published by Marvel Comics. The character first appeared in Iron Man vol. 4 #1 (Jan. 2005) and was created by Warren Ellis and Adi Granov.

Guy Pearce portrayed a retooled version of the character in the Marvel Cinematic Universe film Iron Man 3 (2013).

Publication history
Created by Warren Ellis and Adi Granov, the character first appeared in Iron Man vol. 4 #1 (Jan. 2005).

Fictional character biography
Dr. Aldrich "Al" Killian was a brilliant scientist working for the FuturePharm Corporation in Austin, Texas alongside Dr. Maya Hansen. Together they developed Extremis, a Techno-Organic Virus that completely rewrites the body's genetic code, making entire organs more efficient and giving the body healing abilities in an attempt to create a new super soldier with super human strength, speed, endurance, reflexes and the ability to project electricity and breathe fire. He stole a sample and sold it to a terrorist group (based in a slaughterhouse in Bastrop, Texas) with Mallen as a willing test subject. Days later at FuturePharm Corporation offices, Dr. Killian committed suicide at his computer; his suicide note informed Hansen that he had stolen the Extremis serum for an undisclosed purpose.

In other media

Film
A variation of Aldrich Killian, with elements of Simon Krieger and Mallen, appears in Iron Man 3, portrayed by Guy Pearce. Initially a sickly individual, this version attempted to pitch his think tank, A.I.M., to Tony Stark years prior, but was snubbed by him and swore revenge. Over the years, Killian and co-conspirator Maya Hansen used A.I.M. to conduct research and develop the Extremis virus, which imparts varying levels of strength, resiliency, and pyrokinesis to human subjects, but some of the subjects died in fiery explosions. Despite this, Killian funded the Ten Rings by masquerading as their leader the Mandarin without the true leader Wenwu's knowledge, uses British actor Trevor Slattery to serve as a figurehead, and mounts terrorist attacks as part of his revenge. Ultimately, Killian and his soldiers are defeated and killed by Stark, James Rhodes, and Pepper Potts.

Video games
 Aldrich Killian appears in Iron Man 3: The Official Game. Following the events of the film, A.I.M. transferred his subconscious into MODOK in order to continue his plans.
 The Iron Man 3 incarnation of Aldrich Killian appears as a boss and unlockable playable character in Lego Marvel Super Heroes, voiced by Robin Atkin Downes.
 The Iron Man 3 incarnation of Aldrich Killian appears as a boss and unlockable playable character in Lego Marvel's Avengers, voiced by Greg Miller.

References

External links
 Aldrich Killian at Marvel Wiki
 Aldrich Killian at Comic Vine

Action film villains
Characters created by Warren Ellis
Comics characters introduced in 2005
Fictional biologists
Fictional business executives
Fictional inventors
Fictional mad scientists
Fictional mechanical engineers
Fictional suicides
Film supervillains
Iron Man characters
Male film villains
Marvel Comics film characters
Marvel Comics male supervillains
Marvel Comics scientists